{{DISPLAYTITLE:Phi2 Hydrae}}

Phi2 Hydrae, Latinized from φ2 Hydrae, is a star in the constellation Hydra. It originally received the Flamsteed designation of 1 Crateris before being placed in the Hydra constellation. Based upon an annual parallax shift of 4.31 mas as seen from Earth, it is located roughly 760 light years from the Sun. The star is faintly visible to the naked with an apparent visual magnitude of 6.09.  It forms a triangle with the fainter φ1 Hydrae and the brighter φ3 Hydrae, between μ Hydrae and ν Hydrae.

This is an evolved red giant star with a stellar classification of M1 III. It is currently on the asymptotic giant branch, and is a semiregular variable that undergoes changes in luminosity according to three pulsation periods. The star is radiating an estimated 703 times the Sun's luminosity from its photosphere at an effective temperature of 3,791 K.

Phi2 Hydrae has a faint visual companion: a magnitude 12.20 star at an angular separation of 3.50 arc seconds along a position angle of 280°, as of 1959.

References

M-type giants
Semiregular variable stars
Double stars
Hydra (constellation)
Hydrae, Phi2
091880
051905
4156
Crateris, 01
Durchmusterung objects